Madison Taylor Kocian (born June 15, 1997) is a retired American artistic gymnast. On the uneven bars, she is one of four 2015 world champions and the 2016 Olympic silver medalist. She was part of the gold medal-winning team dubbed the "Final Five" at the 2016 Summer Olympics in Rio de Janeiro, and was a member of the first-place American teams at the 2014 and 2015 World Artistic Gymnastics Championships. She graduated from the University of California, Los Angeles in 2020, where she was a member of its NCAA women's gymnastics team.

Personal life
Kocian was born and raised in Dallas, Texas. Her parents, Thomas and Cindy Kocian, put her in gymnastics at a young age. At age five her parents began taking Kocian to World Olympic Gymnastics Academy (WOGA) in Plano, Texas for her gymnastics training. WOGA is owned by Valeri Liukin and was the gym where Olympic All Around champions Carly Patterson and Nastia Liukin trained. Patterson and Liukin served as early inspirations for Kocian, particularly Liukin, who Kocian has likened to an older sister. Kocian has one younger brother. She was raised Catholic.

Kocian attended Spring Creek Academy in Plano, Texas, the same school that Patterson and Liukin attended. She graduated from high school in 2015. She committed to attend the University of California, Los Angeles (UCLA) in the fall of 2016 and competed for UCLA women's gymnastics.

On August 16, 2018, Kocian came forward as a survivor of Larry Nassar's sexual abuse alongside UCLA teammate Kyla Ross.

Kocian is a big fan of the Texas Rangers baseball team.

Junior career

2009–2010
Kocian made the U.S. Junior National Team in 2009, when she was 12. At the National Championships, she placed sixth in the all-around. Later that year, Kocian was selected to compete for Team USA at the Top Gym Junior competition in Charleroi, Belgium. She won a bronze medal in the all-around competition, a gold on the uneven bars, and a silver on the balance beam.

In 2010, at age 13, Kocian placed fifth at the U.S. Classic in Chicago and qualified to compete at the U.S. National Championships in Hartford, Connecticut, where she won a bronze medal on the uneven bars.

2011–2012
In 2011, Kocian competed in only two meets, the WOGA Classic and City of Jesolo Trophy, an international meet held in Venice, Italy. In Italy, she won the gold in the Junior Division, scoring 57.750. In 2012, Kocian missed the season due to an injury but earned a silver medal at the WOGA Classic.

Senior career

2013
Kocian's senior career started in 2013 at the Secret U.S Classic, held in Hoffman Estates, Illinois, where she placed 7th all-around and earned a silver on the bars, scoring 14.450. Qualifying to the U.S Nationals, Kocian started off well on the uneven bars and balance beam but on her third pass on the floor exercise, she twisted her ankle and was taken out of the competition, missing the vault rotation as well as Day Two. She was not selected for the World Championship team, but she still was named to the National Team.

2014
She started off her 2014 season competing at the WOGA Classic, an International meet hosted by her club.

Kocian competed on two events, bars and beam, at the 2014 Secret U.S. Classic, finishing second on bars and 12th overall.

At nationals, she competed on balance beam and uneven bars. On bars, she won the silver. She placed 5th on beam.

In August and September, Kocian competed at the Pan American Championships in Mississauga, Ontario, Canada. She helped the American team place first in the team competition. In the event finals, she placed second on the uneven bars, scoring 14.825.

On September 17, Kocian was selected to compete at the 2014 World Championships in Nanning, China. In qualifications, she competed in the all-around and qualified in 14th place with a score of 55.966, but did not make it into the all-around final due to the two-per-country rule and Simone Biles, Kyla Ross and Mykayla Skinner having higher scores. She competed in the team final on the bars, and contributed a bars score of 14.900 to the U.S. team's gold-medal finish.

2015
On July 25, Kocian competed at the Secret U.S. Classic and finished first on uneven bars with a score of 15.600, ahead of 2012 Olympic all-around champion and uneven bars finalist Gabby Douglas and Bailie Key. She also placed ninth on balance beam with a shaky routine with several wobbles, scoring a 13.850.

On August 13 and 15, Kocian competed at the 2015 P&G Championships, where she competed in the all-around for the first time since 2013 where she severely injured her ankle. She placed 6th in the all-around with a two-night total of 115.950, placing behind Simone Biles, Maggie Nichols, Aly Raisman, Bailie Key, and Gabby Douglas. She placed ahead of her WOGA teammate Alyssa Baumann and 2014 Worlds teammate Mykayla Skinner by 0.250.

Kocian started on beam where she fell on her Arabian and had a shaky routine and scored a 13.100. On floor, she had a low landing on her double Arabian but stuck her double pike. She scored a 13.800 with a 5.6 start value. On vault, she landed her double-twisting Yurchenko and scored a 14.650. On bars, her best event, she had beautiful lines and execution that included a Komova II-Pak Salto-Chow 1/2 connections and landed her tucked full-in for a score of 15.500, the highest bar score of the night. She ended the night in 11th place with a total all-around score of 57.050.

On Night 2, Kocian started on floor where she had better landings on her tumbling passes for a score of 14.250, totaling her score to 28.050, placing 8th on the event. On vault, she performed a well-executed double-twisting Yurchenko and scored a 14.800. On bars, she repeated her difficult routine with excellent connections and stuck her tucked-full in dismount for a score of 15.600. With her total of 31.100, she took first on the event ahead of 2014 national uneven bars champion and 2014 Worlds teammate Ashton Locklear and Key. On beam, she took out her Arabian because she fell on the skill on Night 1 and tweaked her ankle. She added a few connections to keep her start value consistent. She scored a 14.250. She placed 12th on the event with a total of 27.350.

2015 World Championships
Kocian was named to the Senior National Team once again and was selected to compete at the 2015 World Championships in Glasgow, Scotland. At these World Championships she anchored the USA on uneven bars toward its third consecutive team title, and qualified third to the uneven bars final.

In the uneven bars final, she scored a 15.366, placing her in a historic four-way tie for the gold medal with Russians Viktoria Komova and Daria Spiridonova, and China's Fan Yilin. Kocian joined Marcia Frederick (1978), Shannon Miller (1993), Courtney Kupets (2002), Chellsie Memmel and Hollie Vise (2003), and Nastia Liukin (2005) as the American world champions on uneven bars. She also became the third uneven bars world champion from her gym, WOGA, joining Vise and Liukin.

2016

In February, Kocian competed on the balance beam and the uneven bars at the WOGA Classic and placed first on both events, with scores of 15.550 and 15.700, respectively. She also placed first as part of the WOGA team.

In March, Kocian, along with fellow National Team members Simone Biles, Gabby Douglas, Maggie Nichols, and Aly Raisman, attended the Team USA Media Summit in Los Angeles, an event for the media to interview and interact with athletes who will compete at the 2016 Olympic Games in Rio de Janeiro. Kocian attended the event on crutches and wearing a cast, and confirmed to reporters that she had a sustained a fractured tibia that would likely take her out of contention for the 2016 City of Jesolo Trophy and 2016 Pacific Rim Championships teams. She recovered in time to compete in the U.S. Classic, the P&G Gymnastics Championships, and the 2016 Olympic Team Trials.

On July 10, 2016, Kocian was named to the U.S. team for the 2016 Olympics alongside Biles, Douglas, Raisman, and Laurie Hernandez.

2016 Rio de Janeiro Olympics

On August 7, Kocian competed in the women's qualification round at the 2016 Summer Olympics. After showing all events in podium training, she competed only on the uneven bars, scoring a 15.833. Her score was the highest on that event and qualified her in first place to the individual uneven bars event final. The team total also qualified USA into first for the team final. In the team final on August 9, Kocian again competed on the uneven bars, anchoring team USA on the event. She contributed a 15.933 (tying the highest mark of the competition in any event) to help the team to its second consecutive team gold at an Olympic games. This was the first time any US team won two consecutive team golds.

On August 14, Kocian won a silver medal in the uneven bars event final, scoring 15.833 and placing second behind Aliya Mustafina of Russia and ahead of bronze medalist Sophie Scheder of Germany. This is the first American Olympic medal on the uneven bars since Nastia Liukin in 2008. Additionally, she is the third gymnast from WOGA to become an Olympic champion following 2004 and 2008 Olympic all around champions Carly Patterson and Nastia Liukin.

College career

2017
Kocian began attending the University of California, Los Angeles in fall 2016, and joined the UCLA Bruins gymnastics program. Her collegiate debut came on January 7, 2017, in a home dual meet against the University of Arkansas where she won three individual event titles and tallied an all-around score of 39.425 to win the all-around title. 2012 Olympic gold medalist Kyla Ross was also at the meet, where the two became the first Olympic gold medalists to compete as NCAA gymnasts. In February 2017, she scored a perfect 10.0 on the uneven bars in a dual meet against Stanford.

On March 27, 2017, Kocian received first-team regular season All-American honors in the All-Around and second-team honors on Floor Exercise. She helped UCLA place fourth in the Super Six at the 2017 NCAA National Championship, where she placed 7th in the All-Around.

2018
On August 21, 2017, Kocian underwent surgery to repair her torn labrum, an injury she had dealt with since 2016 Olympic Trials. She returned to NCAA competition on January 20, 2018, in a dual meet against Arizona, competing on only balance beam. She added floor exercise to her repertoire on February 25 in a dual meet against Oregon State, and competed on uneven bars for the first time since her injury at the NCAA Regional Championship on April 7.

With her three routines, she helped UCLA place first in the semi-finals to qualify for the Super Six at the 2018 NCAA National Championship. During the Super Six finals, she fell on the balance beam but contributed great performances on uneven bars and floor exercise to help UCLA win their first NCAA Gymnastics title since 2010.

2019
On January 21, Kocian earned her second career perfect 10 on uneven bars in a meet against Arizona State. She earned several post-season accolades, including Pac-12 First Team honors on uneven bars and was named to the Pac-12 All-Academic team with a 3.81 GPA.

2020 
Kocian was sidelined for the first few weeks of the 2020 season with shoulder soreness.  Kocian returned to competition at the BYU, Utah State tri-meet where she competed on both bars and floor. 

In March Kocian was named as the Pac-12 Conference scholar-athlete of the year for the sport of gymnastics.  At the conclusion of the school year Kocian was named UCLA scholar-athlete of the year alongside cross country athlete Millen Trujillo.  Additionally she was named as the Bruins’ Tom Hansen Medal recipient alongside Darnay Holmes.

Career perfect 10.0

Selected competitive skills

Competitive history

References

External links

1997 births
Living people
American female artistic gymnasts
American people of Czech descent
Medalists at the World Artistic Gymnastics Championships
World champion gymnasts
Sportspeople from Dallas
World Olympic Gymnastics Academy
Gymnasts at the 2016 Summer Olympics
Medalists at the 2016 Summer Olympics
Olympic gold medalists for the United States in gymnastics
Olympic silver medalists for the United States in gymnastics
UCLA Bruins women's gymnasts
Gymnasts from Texas
Catholics from Texas
U.S. women's national team gymnasts
NCAA gymnasts who have scored a perfect 10